Halil, a.k.a. Alaattin Halil, was a bey of  Karaman Beylik, a Turkish principality in Anatolia in the 14th century.
 
His father was Mahmut Bey. He succeeded his elder brothers Musa and İbrahim in 1332. He wasn't active in military campaigns. But he commissioned some mosques and other social buildings in Ermenek during his reign. He died in 1340.

References

Karamanids
1340 deaths
14th-century rulers in Asia
Year of birth unknown
Ethnic Afshar people